Northern Tribe is a Finnish merchandising company that produces rock/metal-related clothing series. The part Tampa/part
Oulu based company was founded on December 1, 2006, and is led by Miku Mertanen, Petri Mertanen and Sami Lopakka, who is also known from metal bands Sentenced and KYPCK. The company's slogan is “Become Who You 
Are”.

The Tribe's first two clothing lines are Metallion Hardwear and the army/camo series Legion Of Doom. All products 
are available in their worldwide netstore Northern Tribe Home Camp at https://www.northerntribeofficial.com/. The company 
also has a merchandise service designed especially for bands, clubs, festivals, and the rock-media. Northern Tribe closed doors for 10 years. 

On July 1st, 2022, the website opened up again with Hossa collection.

External links 
 Northern Tribe Home Camp(note: domain has expired as of 4/2013)
 Interview with Sami Lopakka

Finnish brands